Yuanshen Stadium is a station on Line 6 of the Shanghai Metro. It began services on December 29, 2007. It is underground with side platforms, sandwiched between two interchange stations on Line 6. It is located at the junction of Zhangyang Road and Yuanshen Road. It is very close to Lujiazui financial district, and is sometimes included as part of it.

Around the station
 Pudong Mosque

References 

Railway stations in Shanghai
Shanghai Metro stations in Pudong
Railway stations in China opened in 2007
Line 6, Shanghai Metro